Stary Sielec  is a village in the administrative district of Gmina Jutrosin, within Rawicz County, Greater Poland Voivodeship, in west-central Poland. Marek Kozica is the village administrator.

References

Stary Sielec